Gungywamp  is an archaeological site in Groton, Connecticut, United States, consisting of artifacts dating from 2000-770 BC, a stone circle, and the remains of both Native American and colonial structures.  Among multiple structural remains, of note is a stone chamber featuring an astronomical alignment during the equinoxes. Besides containing beehive chambers and petroglyphs, the Gungywamp site has a double circle of stones near its center, just north of two stone chambers. Two concentric circles of large quarried stones – 21 large slabs laid end to end – are at the center of the site.

The origin and meaning of the name is uncertain. According to The Hartford Courant, researchers have "associated the name, 'Gungywamp' with ancient Gaelic, Mohegan, Pequot, and Algonquin" and could mean anything from "church of the people", "place of ledges", "swampy place"; or "all powerful" and "white," respectively.

In 2018 the deed to 270 acres of the original 400-acre parcel was transferred to the State of Connecticut by the YMCA. Discussions were in progress on how to allow legal access to the property while preserving the archaeological sites.

Overview
The  site consists of multiple elements covering a broad range of time.  There are remains of houses and potential cloth and iron processing sites.  There are multiple stone chambers currently believed to be root cellars, two of which are completely intact.  Says Connecticut State Archaeologist Nicholas Bellantoni, "The thing that's unique at Gungywamp is that there are so many of them".  

One of these "root cellars", also known as the "calendar chamber", has an astronomical feature where an inner alcove is illuminated during the equinoxes by the alignment of a hole in the west wall, through which the sun shines upon a lighter stone on the opposite side, radiating illumination within the smaller, beehive shaped chamber.

Somewhat removed from the structures, there is a stone circle, actually consisting of two circles of stones, one within the other, over ten feet in diameter.  The outermost ring is made up of twelve stones worked to be curved.  Archaeologists who have studied it consider it to have been a mill. The archaeologist Ken Feder notes that unlike European stone circles the stones are recumbent and not upright and identifies it as a bark mill used to extract tannin for leather making. Walking in a circle animals would pull the mill wheel between the double circle of stones." Other researchers have hypothesized it is a Native American built structure.

Even farther away there is a row of low standing stones, lined up in a north-south facing, one of which features an etched image of a bird with outstretched wings.

Native American artifacts include arrowheads, stone flakes and pottery fragments.  Colonial artifacts include pottery, china, buttons, coins, bottle and window glass, utensils, tobacco pipes, bricks and animal bones.  There have been no artifacts found associated with the stone chambers to give any indication of their purpose.

Stone chambers
The specific function and temporal origin of the stone chambers have yet to be definitively established.  Colonial era root cellars constructed by Euro-Americans is currently considered to be the strongest possibility.  Other possibilities include construction by slaves in colonial times, or by Native Americans such as the Pequot or Mohegan tribes.  It has been suggested that the site could be one of the ceremonial stone landscapes described by USET, United South and Eastern Tribes, Inc., in their resolution on sacred ceremonial stone landscapes.
However, the site is most known among the general public due to the suggestion, originally made in the 1960s, that the stone chambers share similarities with structures from Medieval Ireland.  This has been taken by some to indicate that Irish monks, or Culdees, were involved, and that therefore the site contains evidence of pre-Columbian European settlement of the Americas.

North complex
This area lacks stone chambers but it contains some interesting structures. One is a low earthen berm with a rectangular shape. When James Whittall, Jr. excavated the berm, he found stumps of posts on three sides indicating a Native American lodge built of saplings. Associated with the lodge were two hearths.  Nearby is an elongated cairn in the shape of a boat (narrow at the tips and wide in the middle). On top of this cairn were three short standing stones. In the same general area there is a group of nineteen cairns built on the ground. More cairns were built on top of boulders scattered about the area. There were also three standing stones in the area.

References

External links
http://www.dpnc.org/gungywamp/ Denison Pequotsepos Nature Center virtual tour]

Buildings and structures in Groton, Connecticut
Tourist attractions in New London County, Connecticut
Archaeological sites in Connecticut
Archaeological sites in New London County, Connecticut
Geography of New London County, Connecticut